is a 1960 Japanese horror film directed by Tokuzō Tanaka and produced by Daiei Film. The film is about Samurai warriors joining forces to defeat a shape-changing supernatural creature.

Cast

Release 
The Demon of Mount Oe was released in Japan on April 27, 1960. The film was released on VHS in Japan by Daiei on December 12, 1997 and was released on DVD by Kadokawa Shoten on January 24, 2014.

References

External links 

 

1960 films
1960s Japanese-language films
Japanese horror films
Japanese fantasy drama films
Daiei Film tokusatsu films
Daiei Film films
1960 horror films
Films directed by Tokuzō Tanaka
1960s Japanese films